ILGA-Europe is the European region of the International Lesbian, Gay, Bisexual, Trans and Intersex Association. It is an advocacy group promoting the interests of lesbian, gay, bisexual, trans and intersex (LGBTI) people, at the European level. Its membership comprises more than 500 organisations from throughout Europe and Central Asia. The association enjoys consultative status at the United Nations Economic and Social Council and participatory status at the Council of Europe.

History
ILGA-Europe was founded in 1996, when its parent organisation, the International Lesbian, Gay, Bisexual, Trans and Intersex Association, established separate regions. It took over responsibility for supporting the development of the LGBT movement in Europe including Transgender Europe, Inter-LGBT, and for relationships with the European Union, Council of Europe and the Organization for Security and Co-operation in Europe.

Initially ILGA-Europe worked entirely on the basis of volunteer resources. However, in 2001, its potential contribution to the European Union's anti-discrimination policies (established under Article 13 of the Treaty of Amsterdam) was recognised through the provision of core funding, currently through the PROGRESS Programme. This enabled ILGA-Europe to set up an office in Brussels, to recruit permanent staff, and to conduct an extensive programme of work in relation to sexual orientation discrimination within the EU Member States and the accession countries. Financial support from the Sigrid Rausing Trust, the Open Society Institute, Freedom House, the US State Department and the Ministry of Education, Culture and Science of the Netherlands allows ILGA-Europe to extend its work in areas not covered by EU funding, including Eastern Europe and Central Asia, and on transgender issues.

ILGA-Europe has hosted its annual conference at the end of October, since 2000, where member organisations elect the Executive Board and decide on the next year's working priorities.

Current work

ILGA-Europe works to promote equality and non-discrimination for LGBTI people in asylum, education, employment, family law, freedom of assembly, hate crime, hate speech and health; and works worldwide to protect human rights defenders, trans people and intersex people. The Association provides funding and training for its 500 member organisations, "to maximise efficiency and the use of resources by LGBTI organisations in working towards achievement of their goals; to maximise the impact of advocacy work at the European level; to ensure sustainability of the LGBTI movement in Europe."

ILGA-Europe works with EU Institutions, the Council of Europe and the Organization for Security and Co-operation in Europe to promote equality by lobbying and advocacy, including supporting the adoption of the proposed EU Anti-Discrimination Directive, that would ban discrimination on the grounds of age, disability, religion or belief and sexual orientation in all areas of EU competence. It also uses strategic litigation at the European Court of Human Rights and the European Court of Justice to end discrimination, by identifying gaps in protections, encouraging organisations and individuals to develop court cases, and support such cases with legal resources and amicus curiae briefs.

For the 2014 European Parliament election, ILGA-Europe promoted its Come Out 2014 European Election Pledge to candidate MEPs, which focused on priority LGBTI issues for the 2014–2019 Parliament: an EU roadmap on LGBTI equality; EU human rights enforcement; completing the EU Anti-Discrimination directive; combating homophobic and transphobic violence; an inclusive definition of 'family'; trans rights and depatholigisation; action against school bullying; health discrimination and inequalities; LGBTI asylum seekers; and making the EU champion LGBTI rights worldwide. 187 elected MEPs (25 percent) signed the pledge, including 83 members of the PES, 14 ALDE members and 14 from the EPP.

Today ILGA-Europe has more than 20 staff who work in four areas: Advocacy, Communications, Finance and Administration, and Programmes. All are based at the organisation's office in the European Quarter in Brussels.

Rainbow Europe
Each May, ILGA-Europe releases its Rainbow Europe review, to mark the International Day Against Homophobia and Transphobia. It reviews the human rights situation and assesses what life is like for LGBTI people in every European country, covering discrimination, family recognition, hate speech/crimes, gender recognition, freedom of assembly, association and express, and asylum laws. In 2016, Malta came top of the rankings; it was rated to have 88% progress toward respect of human rights and full equality, just ahead of Belgium and the United Kingdom. Azerbaijan was ranked as the worst for LGBTI equality, scoring just 5%, closely followed by Russia, Armenia and Turkey. The biggest increase since the 2015 review, was that of Greece by 19 points (picking 58%). The 2016 Rainbow Europe reviews are given in the table below.

International Intersex Forum 

To include intersex people in its remit, ILGA-Europe and ILGA have jointly sponsored the only international gathering of intersex activists and organisations. The International Intersex Forum has taken place in Europe annually since 2011.

The third forum was held in Malta in 2013 with 34 people representing 30 organisations from all continents. The closing statement affirmed the existence of intersex people, reaffirmed "the principles of the First and Second International Intersex Fora and extend the demands aiming to end discrimination against intersex people and to ensure the right of bodily integrity, physical autonomy and self-determination". For the first time, participants made a statement on birth registrations, in addition to other human rights issues.

References

Further reading

External links
ILGA-Europe's website
ILGA's website

International LGBT political advocacy groups
Organizations with participatory status with the Council of Europe
Organizations established in 1996
International Lesbian, Gay, Bisexual, Trans and Intersex Association